Milena Duchková (25 born April 1952 in Prague) is a Czech diver. She competed at the 1968 Summer Olympics in Mexico City, where she received a gold medal in Platform Diving. She received a silver medal in 1972.

Personal
In late 1980, Duchková applied for permanent Canadian residency, along with her husband Petr Neveklovsky, then 33 years old and 22-month-old daughter Misa. Although her husband could only speak very little English, he was a highly regarded volleyball coach. Outside of diving, Duchková was also registered as a doctor, dentist and an oral surgeon, with hopes to open her own practice in Newfoundland following acceptance of their residency application. The family were concerned about raising their daughter in Czechoslovakia, according to her diving coach Don Webb, who had arranged for her one-year visa in Canada.

Awards
She was inducted into the International Swimming Hall of Fame in Fort Lauderdale, Florida in 1983.

See also
 List of members of the International Swimming Hall of Fame

References

External links

1952 births
Living people
Divers at the 1968 Summer Olympics
Divers at the 1972 Summer Olympics
Divers at the 1976 Summer Olympics
Olympic gold medalists for Czechoslovakia
Czech female divers
Czechoslovak female divers
Czechoslovak exiles
Sportspeople from Prague
Olympic medalists in diving
Medalists at the 1972 Summer Olympics
Medalists at the 1968 Summer Olympics
World Aquatics Championships medalists in diving
Olympic silver medalists for Czechoslovakia
Universiade medalists in diving
Universiade gold medalists for Czechoslovakia
Medalists at the 1973 Summer Universiade